Fodé Ballo-Touré (born 3 January 1997) is a professional footballer who plays as a left-back for  club AC Milan. Born in France, he plays for the Senegal national team.

Club career

Lille
Ballo-Touré developed through the Paris Saint-Germain academy. On 1 July 2017, his contract with PSG expired and he signed with Lille OSC managed by Head Coach Marcelo Bielsa. He made his Ligue 1 debut on 6 August 2017 in a 3–0 home win against Nantes. He started the match and was replaced by Rominigue Kouamé at halftime.

Monaco
On 10 January 2019, Ballo-Touré signed with Monaco.

AC Milan
On 18 July 2021, Ballo-Touré signed a contract with AC Milan until June 2025.

International career
Ballo-Touré was born in France and is of Malian and Senegalese descent. He was a youth international for France. However, he decided to represent Senegal on senior level, over France and Mali. He made his debut for Senegal in a 0–0 draw against Congo on 26 March 2021.

Career statistics

Club

International

Honours
AC Milan
Serie A: 2021–22

Senegal
Africa Cup of Nations: 2021

References

External links

 Profile at the AC Milan website
 
 

1997 births
Living people
People from Conflans-Sainte-Honorine
Footballers from Yvelines
Citizens of Senegal through descent
Senegalese footballers
Senegal international footballers
French footballers
France youth international footballers
French sportspeople of Senegalese descent
Association football defenders
Ligue 1 players
Serie A players
Lille OSC players
AS Monaco FC players
A.C. Milan players
2021 Africa Cup of Nations players
2022 FIFA World Cup players
Africa Cup of Nations-winning players
French expatriate footballers
Senegalese expatriate footballers
Expatriate footballers in Italy